Clinkscale or Clinkscales is a surname. Notable people with the surname include:

Surnames
 Cliff Clinkscales (born 1984), American basketball player
 Dextor Clinkscale (born 1958), American football player
 Joey Clinkscales (born 1964), American football player
 Ron Clinkscale (born 1933), American football player

Middle name
 James Clinkscales Hill (1924-2017), American judge

Fictional characters
 Howard Clinkscales, fictional character